Ináncs is a village in Encs District of Borsod-Abaúj-Zemplén County in northeastern Hungary.

References

Populated places in Borsod-Abaúj-Zemplén County